The 2019 Belarusian Super Cup was held on 2 March 2019 between the 2018 Belarusian Premier League champions BATE Borisov and the 2017–18 Belarusian Cup winners Dinamo Brest. Dinamo Brest won the match 3–1 and won the trophy for the second time.

Match details

See also
2018 Belarusian Premier League
2017–18 Belarusian Cup

References

Belarusian Super Cup
Super
Belarusian Super Cup
Sports competitions in Minsk
2010s in Minsk
Belarusian Super Cup 2019